Gregory Klazura (born January 27, 1989) is a former American soccer player who most recently played for the Vancouver Whitecaps FC in Major League Soccer.

Career

College & amateur
Klazura played soccer in the NCAA for the Notre Dame Fighting Irish. He spent five years with the Fighting Irish where he appeared in 38 matches. In his fifth year he was named co-captain.

Klazura also spent two seasons with the Indiana Invaders of the USL Premier Development League.

Professional
On January 17, 2012, Klazura was drafted by Vancouver Whitecaps FC in the second-round of the 2012 MLS Supplemental Draft. After impressing the coaching staff during the preseason he was signed by the Whitecaps on February 22, 2012.  On May 2, Klazura made his debut in a 2-0 win over FC Edmonton in the Canadian Championship.

Following the 2013 MLS season, Klazura and the Whitecaps did not come to terms on a new contract. That year, Klazura traveled to Zimbabwe to play professional soccer for Bantu Tshintsha Guluva Rovers. He also worked for the GrassRootSoccer Organization to educate children on the risks of HIV and AIDS. Klazura began medical school at the University of Illinois at Chicago College of Medicine in August 2014.

References

External links
 
 Notre Dame bio

1989 births
Living people
Sportspeople from Rockford, Illinois
American soccer players
American expatriate soccer players
Notre Dame Fighting Irish men's soccer players
Indiana Invaders players
Vancouver Whitecaps FC players
Vancouver Whitecaps FC U-23 players
Association football defenders
Soccer players from Illinois
Expatriate soccer players in Canada
USL League Two players
Major League Soccer players
Vancouver Whitecaps FC draft picks
American expatriate sportspeople in Canada
American expatriate sportspeople in Zimbabwe
Expatriate footballers in Zimbabwe
University of Illinois Chicago alumni